Yury Vasilchanka (born 1 April 1994) is a Belarusian hammer thrower.

Career
Whilst competing at the Athletics at the 2020 Summer Olympics – Men's hammer throw Vasilchanka threw 74.00m to finish seventh in qualifying heat B.

Doping
Vasilchanka received a four-year doping ban from May 2015 following a positive drug test for a banned substance whilst in competition in Germany.

References

1994 births
Living people
Athletes (track and field) at the 2020 Summer Olympics
Olympic athletes of Belarus
Doping cases in athletics
Belarusian male hammer throwers
20th-century Belarusian people
21st-century Belarusian people